Astragalus kirrindicus is a species of milkvetch in the family Fabaceae.

References

kirrindicus
Taxa named by Pierre Edmond Boissier